The Erie West Subdivision is a railroad line owned by CSX Transportation in the U.S. states of Pennsylvania and Ohio. The line runs from Derby, New York southwest along the shore of Lake Erie to Cleveland, Ohio, along the former New York Central Railroad main line.

At its east end (west of downtown Erie), the Erie West Subdivision becomes the Lake Shore Subdivision; at its west end (east of downtown Cleveland), it becomes the Cleveland Terminal Subdivision. This subdivision is also known as the Great Lakes Service Lane.
Amtrak's Lake Shore Limited and Capitol Limited use the Erie West Subdivision.

History 
The line was built by the Cleveland, Painesville and Ashtabula Railroad and opened in 1852. Through mergers, leases, and takeovers, it became part of the Lake Shore and Michigan Southern Railway, New York Central Railroad, and Conrail. When Conrail was broken up in 1999, the main line east of Cleveland, including the Erie West Subdivision, was assigned to CSX. In 2007 in Painesville, Ohio on this line, a major freight train derailment occurred resulting in the spill of ethanol and a large fire.

See also
CSX Bridge (Painesville, Ohio)

References

CSX Transportation lines
Rail infrastructure in Pennsylvania
Rail infrastructure in Ohio
Lake Shore and Michigan Southern Railway lines
https://www.openrailwaymap.org/